Ternovsky or Ternovskoy ( or ; masculine), Ternovskaya (feminine), or Ternovskoye (neuter) is the name of several rural localities in Russia:
Ternovskoy, a khutor in Ternovskoye Rural Settlement of Sholokhovsky District of Rostov Oblast
Ternovsky, Chertkovsky District, Rostov Oblast, a khutor in Sokhranovskoye Rural Settlement of Chertkovsky District of Rostov Oblast
Ternovsky, Yegorlyksky District, Rostov Oblast, a khutor in Obyedinennoye Rural Settlement of Yegorlyksky District of Rostov Oblast
Ternovsky, Stavropol Krai, a khutor in Kazinsky Selsoviet of Andropovsky District of Stavropol Krai
Ternovsky, Voronezh Oblast, a settlement in Ternovskoye Rural Settlement of Novokhopyorsky District of Voronezh Oblast
Ternovskaya, Krasnodar Krai, a stanitsa in Ternovsky Rural Okrug of Tikhoretsky District of Krasnodar Krai
Ternovskaya, Rostov Oblast, a stanitsa in Kalininskoye Rural Settlement of Tsimlyansky District of Rostov Oblast